Poslednja mladost u Jugoslaviji is the first solo album by former Idoli members Nebojša Krstić and Srđan Šaper. For the occasion, the two formed a backing band Unutrašnja Imperija.

History 

After Idoli split up, the first solo release by any Idoli member was Poslednja mladost u Jugoslaviji by Krstić & Šaper. The two started writing and recording new material in 1986 and the album came out in 1987 through Jugoton. The two also formed a backing band, Unutrašnja Imperija featuring Dragomir Mihajlović "Gagi" (guitar), Branko Isaković (bass) and Dragoljub Đuričić (drums). The material and album production was done by Krstić & Šaper themselves with the help of Branko Isaković and Srđan Gojković.

Track listing 

 "16 godina" (3:16) (Krstić, Šaper)
 "Divlja devojka" (3:24) (Srđan Šaper)
 "Haljine" (3:12) (Nebojša Krstić)
 "Ti i ja" (4:08) (Srđan Šaper)
 "Razvod 1999" (3:38) (Srđan Šaper)
 "Sutra nije nikada" (3:17) (Nebojša Krstić)
 "Ne, ne, ne" (3:37) (Srđan Šaper)
 "Parada" (3:16) (Srđan Šaper)
 "Kad si je prvi put poljubio" (2:46) (Srđan Šaper)
 "Čovek časa" (3:32) (Srđan Šaper)
 "Odjednom" (2:45) (Krstić, Šaper)
 "Bliži se čas" (4:21) (Srđan Šaper)

Personnel 
 Nebojša Krstić (vocals)
 Srđan Šaper (vocals)
 Dragomir Mihajlović "Gagi" (guitar)
 Branko Isaković (bass)
 Dragoljub Đuričić (drums)

External links 
 EX YU ROCK enciklopedija 1960-2006,  Janjatović Petar;  

1987 debut albums
Nebojša Krstić albums
Srđan Šaper albums